Ponsanooth (meaning "bridge at the stream") is a village and civil parish in Cornwall, England, United Kingdom. It is about four miles southeast of Redruth and two and a half miles northwest of Penryn on the A393 road Redruth to Falmouth road. In 2019 it had an estimated population of 1184.

The church of St Michael and All Angels is now part of a larger benefice, sharing a single vicar with Mabe. Also the village has a shop which includes a post office, village hall, primary school  and a public house called The Stag Hunt

The River Kennall runs nearby: in the 19th century, this river worked a flour mill and a number of gunpowder mills, machinery at a foundry, and a paper mill. The gunpowder mills supplied many of the mines of west Cornwall until 1910, by which time gunpowder had been largely replaced by high explosives. The site of one of the ruined mills is now within a Nature Reserve. Frederick Hamilton Davey the botanist (died 23 September 1915) was born at Ponsanooth and was buried in the Wesleyan Cemetery there.

Civil parish 
Until 1 April 2021 the civil parish was called St Gluvias which doesn't include the Penryn suburb St Gluvias. The parish population at the 2011 census was 1,668.

References

Villages in Cornwall
Civil parishes in Cornwall